Pontinus is a genus of marine ray-finned fish belonging to the family Scorpaenidae, the scorpionfishes. The scorpionfishes in this genus are distributed in the tropical and warm temperate parts Atlantic, Indian and Pacific Oceans.

Taxonomy
Pontinus was first described as a genus in 1860 by the Cuban zoologist Felipe Poey y Aloy when he was describing the longsnout scorpionfish (P. castor) which he had collected at Havana, as this species was the only species Poey definitely placed within the new genus it is its type species by monotypy. The genus name from is derived from pontis, meaning "bridge", an allusion to the suborbital stay, or ridge, which is found in all the species in the subfamily Scorpaeninae.

Species
There are currently 19 recognized species in this genus:
 Pontinus accraensis Norman, 1935 (Ghanean rockfish)
 Pontinus castor Poey, 1860 (Longsnout scorpionfish)
 Pontinus clemensi Fitch, 1955 (Mottled scorpionfish)
 Pontinus corallinus A. Miranda-Ribeiro, 1903
 Pontinus furcirhinus Garman, 1899
 Pontinus helena Eschmeyer, 1965
 Pontinus kuhlii (S. Bowdich, 1825) (Offshore rockfish)
 Pontinus leda Eschmeyer, 1969 (Speckled deepwater scorpionfish)
 Pontinus longispinis Goode & T. H. Bean, 1896 (Longspine scorpionfish)
 Pontinus macrocephalus (Sauvage, 1882) (Large-headed scorpionfish)
 Pontinus nematophthalmus (Günther, 1860) (Spinythroat scorpionfish)
 Pontinus nigerimum Eschmeyer, 1983 (Blacklash scorpionfish)
 Pontinus nigropunctatus (Günther, 1868) (St. Helena deepwater scorpionfish)
 Pontinus rathbuni Goode & T. H. Bean, 1896 (Highfin scorpionfish)
 Pontinus rhodochrous (Günther, 1872)
 Pontinus sierra (C. H. Gilbert, 1890) (Speckled scorpionfish)
 Pontinus strigatus Heller & Snodgrass, 1903 (Stalkeye scorpionfish)
 Pontinus tentacularis (Fowler, 1938)
 Pontinus vaughani Barnhart & C. L. Hubbs, 1946 (Spotback scorpionfish)

Characteristics
Pontinus scorpionfishes have very bony heads The head has 2 preorbital spines over the maxillary, 3-4 spines on the suborbital ridge although the first spine on the preorbital bone is frequently absent. There is a supplemental preopercular spine and the uppermost preopercular spine is the longest with the second preopercular spine being often absent, then the third and fourth are present but the 5th may be present or absent. They have both vomerine teeth and paltine teeth. The dorsal fin contains 12 spines and 9-10 sot rays while the anal-fin has 3 spines and 5 soft rays with the rearmost ray deeply split. There are 15-20 unbranched fin rays in the pectoral fin. They have a swimbladder The scales on the body are ctenoid and the cheek, postorbital area and top of head are all scaled. They do not have an occipital pit.

Distribution and habitat
Pontinus scorpionfishes are found in tropical and temperate waters of the Atlantic Indian and Pacific Oceans. These are demersal fishes.

References

Scorpaenini
 
Venomous fish
Extant Rupelian first appearances
Marine fish genera
Taxa named by Felipe Poey
Rupelian genus first appearances